Kolob Arch is a natural arch in Zion National Park, Utah, United States. According to the Natural Arch and Bridge Society (NABS), it is the sixth-longest natural arch in the world. In 2006, the Society measured the span at 287.4 ± 2 feet (87.6 m), which is slightly shorter than Landscape Arch in Arches National Park. Differences in measuring technique or definitions could produce slightly different results and change this ranking.

The arch can also be reached from Ice Box Canyon, a canyoneering route in this section of Zion National Park. The arch is high above the ground and close to a cliffside that it frames.

References

External links

Natural Arch and Bridge Society article
Kolob Information about Kolob Arch, Kolob Canyons and Kolob Terrace.

Natural arches of Utah
Landforms of Washington County, Utah
Zion National Park